"Sheikh San'Aan" or "San'Aan" is the title of a Persian mystical poem written by the Persian Sufi poet Farid ud-Din Attar. "Sheikh San'Aan" is the longest story in the book The Conference of the Birds.

Synopsis
Sheikh San'Aan, an old man, is highly devout and the leader of his people. He has lived in Kaaba for about fifty years, accepting disciples and praying and fasting continuously. He has performed the Hajj fifty times and discovered many spiritual secrets.

One day, he has a dream that he is settled in Rûm and bowing to an idol. This dream repeats over several consecutive nights. He travels to Rûm with his disciples, where he meets a Christian woman and falls in love with her, spending over a month begging for her acceptance. The woman comes up with four conditions for the sheikh: bow to the idol, burn the Quran, start drinking wine and abandon the faith.

In addition to fulfilling these conditions, San'Aan shepherds her pigs for a year to pay the mahr. His disciples are disappointed and return to their homeland. A disciple who was not with him on the first trip travels to Rûm, hoping to restore San'Aan, and spends 40 days praying for him. Finally, the disciple sees the Prophet of Islam in a dream and receives the good news of San'Aan's return.

San'Aan is finally freed from the bondage of love. The woman also has a dream; she sees the sun fall beside her and it tells her to go with the sheikh. She travels to his homeland with him and becomes a Muslim.

About poetry
Attar composed this story in an ordered form of 409 verses.

Sample poem
These are verses from the story translated to English:

...

...

See also
 Karnameye Balkh
 Maghrebi Tabrizi
 Tariq ut-tahqiq

References

External links
 Puppets to recount Sheikh San'Aan tragedy from “Conference of the Birds”
 Attar (1984, trans. Davis) - Conference of the Birds
 “SULUK” IN THE STORY OF SHEIKH SANAN AND SIDDHARTHA: A COMPARATIVE ANALYSIS
 Sheikh Sanan and the Christian Maiden
 Shaikh San'an beneath the Window of the Christian Maiden

Sufi literature
Persian literature
Persian poems
Attar of Nishapur
The Conference of the Birds